Events from the year 1758 in France.

Incumbents
 Monarch – Louis XV

Events

The Seven Years' War 
 29 April – Battle of Cuddalore
 12 June – Battle of Rheinberg
 23 June – Battle of Krefeld
 3 August – Battle of Negapatam
 7–16 August – Raid on Cherbourg
 The French and Indian War, the North American theater of the worldwide Seven Years' War

Popular culture

Theatre 
 Le Père de famille, play by Denis Diderot

Births

 4 February – Pierre Gardel, ballet dancer, violinist, and composer (died 1840)
 28 February – Nicolas François, Count Mollien, financier (died 1850)
 22 March – Jean-Charles Monnier, military officer (died 1816)
 6 May – Maximilien Robespierre, politician (died 1794)
 8 July – Pierre Joseph Duhem, physician and politician (died 1807)
 6 September – Pierre-Augustin Hulin, general (died 1841)
 5 November – Louis-Marie Aubert du Petit-Thouars, botanist (died 1831)
 precise date unknown  – Sophie Hus, stage actress (died after 1831)

Deaths
 18 January – François Nicole, mathematician, 74
 18 February – Isaac-Joseph Berruyer, historian, 76
 2 March – Pierre Guérin de Tencin, archbishop, 77
 8 April – Louise Anne de Bourbon, countess, 62
 22 April – Antoine de Jussieu, naturalist, 61
 30 April – François d'Agincourt, harpsichordist, organist, and composer, 74?
 August – François Hutin, painter, sculptor, and engraver, 72?

See also

References

1750s in France